The 2010–11 UCI Europe Tour was the seventh season of the UCI Europe Tour. The season began on 28 October 2010 with the Tour of Marmara and ended on 16 October 2011 with the Chrono des Nations.

The points leader, based on the cumulative results of previous races, wears the UCI Europe Tour cycling jersey. Giovanni Visconti of Italy was the defending champion of the 2009–10 UCI Europe Tour and was crowned as the 2010–11 UCI Europe Tour.

Throughout the season, points are awarded to the top finishers of stages within stage races and the final general classification standings of each of the stages races and one-day events. The quality and complexity of a race also determines how many points are awarded to the top finishers, the higher the UCI rating of a race, the more points are awarded.

The UCI ratings from highest to lowest are as follows:
 Multi-day events: 2.HC, 2.1 and 2.2
 One-day events: 1.HC, 1.1 and 1.2

Events

2010

2011

Final ranking
There is a competition for the rider, team and country with the most points gained from winning or achieving a high place in the above races.

Individual classification

Team classification

Nation classification

Nation under-23 classification

References

External links
 

UCI Europe Tour

UCI
UCI